Øvre Slottsgate is a tram rail station on both the Vika Line and the Briskeby Line. The station is served by lines 11, 12 and 13. Therefore, it is operated with SL79 high-floor trams and SL95 low-floor trams. The station replaced the former Kongens gate and the Wessels plass tram stops.

Transfers

Øvre Slottsgate is a short minute walk from the bus stations at Kvadraturen, Wessels Plass and the now defunct bus and tram stop, Christiania Torv. Nationaltheatret (11,13) and Kontraskjæret (12) are stations succeeding Øvre Slottsgate westbound, while Dronningens gate succeeds Øvre Slottsgate eastbound. The station is also close to the Stortinget station, so it is easy to transfer between the tramway and the metro.

References

Oslo Tramway stations in Oslo